Stephanie Anna Honoré Sanchez (born May 11, 1984) known professionally as Stephanie Honoré, is an American actress. She is best known for her scream queen roles in the  horror films The Final Destination, Mirrors 2, and Now You See Me.

Life and career
Honoré was born in Baton Rouge, Louisiana, where she attended St. Joseph's Academy before graduating from Louisiana State University in 2007. She debuted in 2005 with a supporting role in a horror film Vampire Bats. She made appearances in box-office hits The Final Destination, Now You See Me, Taken 3, and Focus.

In 2009, she married Erick Sanchez, a plastic surgeon. The couple resides in Baton Rouge.

Filmography

Film

Television

References

External links
 
 
 
 
 Filmography at MTV

American film actresses
American television actresses
American female models
Living people
1984 births
Hispanic and Latino American actresses
American entertainers of Cuban descent
Place of birth missing (living people)
21st-century American women